This is a list of people executed in the United States in 2009. Fifty-two people were executed in the United States in 2009. Twenty-four of them were in the state of Texas. One (Larry Bill Elliott) was executed via electrocution. One notable execution was of convicted murderer John Allen Muhammad, who was responsible for carrying out the D.C. sniper attacks in 2002.

List of people executed in the United States in 2009

Demographics

Executions in recent years

See also
 List of death row inmates in the United States
 List of most recent executions by jurisdiction
 List of people scheduled to be executed in the United States
 List of women executed in the United States since 1976

References

List of people executed in the United States
executed
People executed in the United States
2009